The 2021–22 season was the 112th season in the existence of Real Sociedad and the club's 12th consecutive season in the top flight of Spanish football. In addition to the domestic league, Real Sociedad participated in this season's editions of the Copa del Rey and the UEFA Europa League.

Players

First-team squad

Reserve team

Out on loan

Transfers

In

Out

Pre-season and friendlies

Competitions

Overall record

La Liga

League table

Results summary

Results by round

Matches
The league fixtures were announced on 30 June 2021.

Copa del Rey

UEFA Europa League

Group stage

The draw for the group stage was held on 27 August 2021.

Knockout phase

Knockout round play-offs
The draw for the knockout round play-offs was held on 13 December 2021.

Statistics

Squad statistics
Last updated on 22 May 2022.

|-
! colspan="14" style="background:#dcdcdc; text-align:center"|Goalkeepers

|-
! colspan="14" style="background:#dcdcdc; text-align:center"|Defenders

|-
! colspan="14" style="background:#dcdcdc; text-align:center"|Midfielders

|-
! colspan="14" style="background:#dcdcdc; text-align:center"|Forwards

|-
! colspan=14 style=background:#dcdcdc; text-align:center|Players who have made an appearance this season but have left the club

|}

Goalscorers

Notes

References

Real Sociedad seasons
Real Sociedad
2021–22 UEFA Europa League participants seasons